Careproctus ovigerus, commonly known as the abyssal snailfish, is a species of snailfish found in the northeastern Pacific Ocean.

Description
Like other members of the family Liparidae, C. ovigerus is an elongated fish with a gelatinous skin with no scales. The pectoral fins are large and used for locomotion and the pelvic fins are modified into an adhesive disc. The dorsal fin has no spines and 40 to 45 soft rays and the anal fin has no spines and 35 to 36 soft rays. The pelvic disc is 26 to 38% of the total length of the fish. Fish in the genus Careproctus can often be distinguished by the pore pattern made by the cephalic pores (the nasal, maxillary, preoperculomandibular and suprabranchial pores); in this species the pattern formed is 2–6–7–1. This species closely resembles C. lycopersicus and C. kamikawai, but those two species have tri-lobed teeth in several broad bands while C. ovigerus has simple, sharp recurved teeth in a single narrow band.

Behavior
Careproctus ovigerus is thought to be a mouth brooder as the holotype, a male, was found to be carrying two developing eggs in his mouth.

References

Liparidae
Taxa named by Charles Henry Gilbert
Fish described in 1896